Tutun may refer to:

 Tebtunis, Egyptian city
 Turkish tobacco, also called Oriental tobacco
 TUTUN-CTC, a tobacco factory in Chişinău, Moldova